Shkhara is the highest point in the country of Georgia. It is located near the Russian-Georgian border, in Russia's Kabardino-Balkaria region on the northern side, and the Svaneti region of Georgia in the south. The summit lies in the central part of the Greater Caucasus Mountain Range, to the south-east of Mount Elbrus, Europe's highest mountain. Shkhara is the third-highest peak in the Caucasus, just behind Dykh-Tau.

Morphology 
Shkhara is the high point and the eastern anchor of a massif known as the Bezengi Wall, a  ridge. It is a large, steep peak in a heavily glaciated region, and presents serious challenges to mountaineers.

History 
The peak was first climbed in 1888 via the North East Ridge route, by the British/Swiss team of English climber John Garford Cockin and Swiss guides Ulrich Almer and Christian Roth. This route is still one of the easier and more popular routes on the mountain. The first complete traverse of the Bezingi Wall was in 1931, by the Austrians K. Poppinger, K. Moldan, and S. Schintlmeister.

See also 
 List of mountains in Georgia
 List of elevation extremes by country

References

Mountains of Georgia (country)
Mountains of Kabardino-Balkaria
Seven Third Summits
Georgia (country)–Russia border
Five-thousanders of the Caucasus
Highest points of countries